Hypselodoris variobranchia is a species of sea slug or dorid nudibranch, a marine gastropod mollusc in the family Chromodorididae.

Distribution
The holotype of this nudibranch was collected at 30 m depth from Aphol's Rock, Maricaban Island, Tingloy, Batangas Province, Luzon Island, Philippines, . It is a common and widespread species which has been reported from Queensland, Australia; Malaysia; Indonesia and Okinawa, Japan but frequently mistaken for Hypselodoris bullocki or Hypselodoris apolegma.

Description
Hypselodoris variobranchia has a deep purple body with a broad solid white border to the mantle. The bulb of the rhinophores is orange, with purple sheaths. The gills may be orange or deep purple. There is a tall gill pocket which is also deep purple in colour. This species has frequently been reported as Hypselodoris bullocki.
This is a large nudibranch, reaching 50 mm in length.

References

Chromodorididae
Gastropods described in 2018